Paxton-Buckley-Loda High School is a public high school located in Paxton, Illinois. Founded in 1990, it serves the communities of Paxton, Buckley and Loda. PBL had an enrollment of 472 students for the 2016–17 school year.

History
In 1990, declining enrollment at Buckley-Loda High School led to a consolidation with Paxton High School. A new school building was constructed to field all of the students, and the histories of the individual schools were left behind as the new PBL collaboration took effect. The current high school draws students from five Illinois counties, but the bulk of the student body hails from Ford and Iroquois counties.

Demographics
PBL is 93 percent white, six percent Hispanic, and one percent black.

Academics
Paxton-Buckley-Loda offers Advanced Placement classes. About a third of PBL students take an AP class.

Performing arts
PBL has a competitive show choir, nicknamed "Unlimited".

References

Educational institutions established in 1990
Public high schools in Illinois
Education in Ford County, Illinois
1990 establishments in Illinois